Solveig Margareta von Schoultz (5 August 1907 – 3 December 1996) was a Swedish-speaking Finnish writer and teacher. She wrote poetry, children's novels, short stories, plays, and television and radio dramas.

Biography
Solveig von Schoultz was born in Porvoo in 1907 to Albert Segerstråle, a reverend, and Hanna Frosterus-Segerstråle, a painter. She was the youngest of eight children. She studied at the Nykarleby Seminarium during 1925–26, where she qualified as a primary school teacher. She worked as a freelance journalist for the Swedish-language newspaper Borgåbladet. In 1931, she married Sven von Schoultz, a lawyer, and took his surname under which she would publish for the rest of her career. She worked as a schoolteacher at Laguska Skolan, a private girls' school in Helsinki, from 1937 until 1972. In 1961, she divorced Sven von Schoultz and later married the Finnish composer Erik Bergman. She had two daughters, Ursula and Barbara.

von Schoultz made her writing debut in 1932 with the children's book . She was best known, however, for her poetry; she published 15 collections of poems between 1940 and 1996. Her first collection of poems, published in 1940, was titled , and her final collection, published in 1996, was titled . The themes addressed in her poetry include existential issues, womanhood and motherhood. She also wrote fifteen radio plays, four television dramas, three theatrical plays and one novel.

von Schoultz won numerous awards for her writing: the Svenska Dagbladet Literature Prize in 1947, the Swedish Academy of Finland Award in 1970, the Edith Södergran Prize in 1984, the Bellman Prize in 1986, the Nils Ferlin Prize in 1988, the Längmanska Prize in 1993, and the Samfundet De Nio Special Prize in 1996. She published her memoirs, titled , in 1996, the same year that she died.

References

1907 births
1996 deaths
Finnish women novelists
Finnish women poets
People from Porvoo
Writers from Helsinki
Finnish poets in Swedish
Finnish writers in Swedish
Finnish schoolteachers
20th-century Finnish women writers
20th-century Finnish novelists
20th-century Finnish poets
Swedish-speaking Finns